BMN Air (formerly ABM Air or Antigua Barbuda Montserrat Air) is an airline of Antigua and Barbuda. Its headquarters is located at its hub at V. C. Bird International Airport serving the country's main island of Antigua with the capital, Saint John's. The company offers scheduled services to Antigua's sister island Barbuda and to the British overseas territory of Montserrat, as well as charter services between these two destinations.

The airline was set up in 2010, as a subsidiary of SVG Air.

Destinations
Antigua and Barbuda
 Antigua - V. C. Bird International Airport Hub
 Barbuda - Barbuda Codrington Airport
 Montserrat
 Montserrat - John A. Osborne Airport

References

External links
 

Airlines of Antigua and Barbuda
Airlines established in 2010